Trust Fund was a musical project founded and led by Ellis Jones while living in Bristol in the southwest of England. Both on recordings and live, the band also featured a rotating lineup of musicians to fill out the sound. They released four full-length albums between 2015 and 2018, the final of which roughly coincided with the decision to disband.

History
The band self-released an EP titled I've Been Ages, followed by a second, Don't Let Them Begin, and a split EP with Joanna Gruesome, the latter two issued by Reeks of Effort. In early 2015, they signed to Turnstile Records for the release of their first full-length album, "No One's Coming for Us".

Their next album, Seems Unfair, followed shortly after on the same label in the autumn of 2015.

After a relocation to Leeds, a third album, We Have Always Lived in the Harolds, was released in June 2016. Reverting to home recording, it was also released without a record label. The title is a reference to Shirley Jackson’s 1962 novel We Have Always Lived in the Castle, substituting in a group of streets in Leeds collectively known as the Harolds, where Jones lived.

In July 2018, Trust Fund released their fourth and final full-length album, Bringing the Backline.

During their period of activity, Trust Fund toured with Los Campesinos!, Speedy Ortiz, and Mitski.

Discography

Albums
No One's Coming for Us - Turnstile / Reeks of Effort, 12" LP, Cassette, MP3 (2015)
Seems Unfair - Turnstile, 12" LP, MP3 (2015)
We Have Always Lived in the Harolds - Self-released / It Takes Time, 12" LP, Cassette, MP3 (2016)
Bringing the Backline - Self-released / Hidden Bay Records, 12" LP, Cassette, MP3 (2018)

EPs
I've Been Ages - Self-released, CD-R, Cassette, MP3 (2012)
Don't Let Them Begin - Reeks of Effort, Cassette, MP3 (2013)

Split releases
Split EP with Joanna Gruesome - Reeks of Effort / Happy Happy Birthday to Me, 12" EP, MP3 (2014)

References

External links
 Bandcamp page

Underground punk scene in the United Kingdom
British indie pop groups
English indie rock groups
Musical groups from Bristol
Musical groups established in 2011
2011 establishments in England
Musical groups disestablished in 2018
2018 disestablishments in England